The Priene Calendar Inscription (IK Priene 14) is an inscription in stone recovered at Priene (an ancient Greek city, in Western Turkey) that records an edict by Paullus Favius Maximus, proconsul of the Roman province of Asia and a decree of the conventus of the province accepting the edict from 9 BC. The documents align the provincial calendar with the Roman calendar, honouring Augustus by making the provincial year began on his birthday. It refers to Augustus' birth using the term "gospel." It is known as the Priene text because it was found on two stones in the marketplace of the ancient town of Priene. Other copies are known from Apamea and Eumeneia.

The Greek text of the whole inscription has been published several times and the current authoritative edition appears as inscription no. 14 in the Priene volume of the  series.

Current holding
The calendar inscription of Priene is now in the Bibelhaus Erlebnis Museum in Frankfurt through September 2023, on loan from Berlin Museum.

Reference to "gospel"
The inscription features the Greek term , evangelion, meaning "good news," which is the term translated into English as "gospel". The reference occurs in a section of the text recording a speech by the high priest of the conventus, Apollonius of Azania in Caria:

As exemplified in the Calendar Inscription of Priene, this Koine Greek term  was used at the time of the Roman Empire to herald the good news of the arrival of a kingdom - the reign of a king that brought a war to an end, so that all people of the world who surrendered and pledged allegiance to this king would be granted salvation from destruction. The Calendar Inscription of Priene speaks of the birthday of Caesar Augustus as the beginning of the gospel announcing his kingdom, with a Roman decree to start a new calendar system based on the year of Augustus Caesar's birth. Some Christian historians have compared this with the opening of the Gospel of Mark: "The beginning of the gospel of Jesus Christ, the Son of God." (Mark 1:1 ESV)

See also
 Priene Inscription

References

External links

Full Greek text: 
Augustus
Roman archaeology